McElhany is an unincorporated community in southern Newton County, in the U.S. state of Missouri. The community is on U.S. Route 71 approximately five miles south of Neosho.

History
A post office called McElhany was established in 1896, and remained in operation until 1911. The community has the name of the local McElhany family.

References

Unincorporated communities in Newton County, Missouri
Unincorporated communities in Missouri